"All The Things I Should Have Known" is a song by American R&B duo K-Ci & JoJo. It was released in 2001 as the second single from their third studio album X.

Personnel 
Credits adapted from liner notes.

K-Ci & JoJo - lead and background vocals
Babyface - writer, composer, producer, keyboards, drum programming, acoustic guitar and background vocals
Erika Nuri - writer, composer
Nathan East - bass
Paul Boutin - recording engineer
Jon Gass - mixing engineer
Ivy Skoff - production coordinator

Charts 
The song peaked at number 30 on the Rhythmic Top 40.

References 

K-Ci & JoJo songs
2000 songs
Songs written by Babyface (musician)
Songs written by Erika Nuri